Everything, Everything may refer to:
Everything, Everything (album), an album by Underworld
Everything, Everything (novel), a young adult novel by Nicola Yoon
Everything, Everything (film),  a 2017 romantic drama film based on the novel of the same name
Everything Everything, an English indie rock band